Goniobranchus setoensis is a species of sea slug, a dorid nudibranch, a marine gastropod mollusc in the family Chromodorididae.

Taxonomic history
This species was known as Chromodoris setoensis for many years before it was transferred to the genus Goniobranchus on the basis of molecular (DNA) evidence in 2012.

Distribution
This species was described from Japan. It has been confused with Goniobranchus decorus and many records of G. decorus are in fact misidentifications. It occurs in the central Indo-Pacific region from Japan to Sri Lanka, and as far east as the Marshall Islands and Kiribati. The two species are sympatric in the Marshall Islands.

Description
The body of this chromodorid nudibranch is translucent white with opaque white lines, purple spots and a sub-surface margin of orange-red. There is usually a white line around the centre of the back and a line running from between the rhinophores to the middle of the back where it divides to pass around the gills in a loop. Outside the outer white line is a row or double row of purple spots which never have a halo of white around them. There are small white spots along the mantle edge. The tips of the rhinophores and the outer part of the gills is white.

EcologyGoniobranchus setoensis'' feeds on sponges of the family Aplysillidae.

References

Chromodorididae
Gastropods described in 1938